The 2000 Bavarian Cup was the third edition of the competition which started in 1998. It ended with the FC Ismaning winning the competition. Together with finalist TSV Rain am Lech, both clubs qualified for the DFB Cup 2000-01. 

The competition is open to all senior men's football teams playing within the Bavarian football league system and the Bavarian clubs in the Regionalliga Süd (III).

Rules & History
The seven Bezirke in Bavaria each play their own cup competition, which in turn used to function as a qualifying to the German Cup (DFB-Pokal). Since 1998, these seven cup-winners plus the losing finalist of the region that won the previous event advance to the newly introduced Bavarian Cup, the Toto-Pokal. The two finalists of this competition advance to the German Cup. Bavarian clubs which play in the first or second Bundesliga are not permitted to take part in the event; their reserve teams however can. The seven regional cup winners were qualified for the first round. It was the last edition with only seven clubs. The following season, the competition was expanded to eight teams.

Participating clubs
The following seven clubs qualified for the 2000 Bavarian Cup:

Bavarian Cup season 1999-2000 
Teams qualified for the next round in bold.

Regional finals

First round

Semi-finals

Final

DFB Cup 2000-01
The two clubs, TSV Rain am Lech and FC Ismaning, who qualified through the Bavarian Cup for the DFB Cup 2000-01, both were knocked out in the first round of the national cup competition:

References

Sources
 Deutschlands Fussball in Zahlen 1999/2000  Yearbook of German football, author: DSFS, publisher: Agon Sport Verlag, published: 2002, page: 248

External links
 Bavarian FA website  

2000
Bavarian